Stefan Popiel (19 May 1896 – 22 December 1927) was a Polish footballer. He played in two matches for the Poland national football team in 1922 and 1923.

References

External links
 

1896 births
1927 deaths
Polish footballers
Poland international footballers
People from Skawina
Association football goalkeepers
MKS Cracovia (football) players